Marcus Junius Silanus may refer to:

Marcus Junius Silanus (consul 109 BC)
Marcus Junius Silanus (consul 25 BC)
Marcus Junius Silanus (consul 15)
Marcus Junius Silanus (consul 46)
Marcus Junius Silanus (praetor 212 BC)
Marcus Junius Silanus Torquatus